Jackson Township is a township in Dallas County, Arkansas, United States. Its total population was 190 as of the 2010 United States Census, a decrease of 18.10 percent from 232 at the 2000 census.

According to the 2010 Census, Jackson Township is located at  (33.846733, -92.532990).

References

External links 

Townships in Arkansas
Dallas County, Arkansas